Aristobia freneyi is a species of beetle in the family Cerambycidae. It was described by Schmitt in 1992. It is known from Thailand.

References

Lamiini
Beetles described in 1992